The FIA World Touring Car Championship  was an international touring car championship promoted by Eurosport Events and sanctioned by the Fédération Internationale de l'Automobile (FIA). It has had several different incarnations, including a single season in 1987 as the World Touring Car Championship and most recently a world championship (WTCC) that has run between 2005 and 2017. Following the 2017 season, an agreement was reached for the FIA WTCC to become FIA WTCR and use the TCR technical regulations.

History

First season

The first World Touring Car Championship, which was open to Group A Touring Cars, was held in 1987 concurrent to the long-running European Touring Car Championship (ETCC). Additional rounds were held outside Europe at Bathurst and Calder Park Raceway in Australia (Calder used a combined circuit of the road course and the then newly constructed NASCAR speedway), Wellington in New Zealand and Mount Fuji in Japan. The Championship was well-supported by the factory European teams of Ford, BMW, Maserati and Alfa Romeo (until Alfa withdrew following the European races), but was embroiled in controversy. Unfortunately, the leading BMW Motorsport teams and the Ford Europe backed Eggenberger Motorsport had developed a situation of "you don't protest us, we won't protest you". While this worked well in the European races, when the championship landed in Australia the local teams took exception to the Europeans somewhat liberal interpretation of the Group A rules. Subsequently, the Eggenberger cars were protested against and eventually disqualified from the Bathurst 1000 results.

The championship was provisionally awarded to West German Eggenberger Ford Sierra RS500 drivers Klaus Ludwig and Klaus Niedzwiedz. It was not until March 1988 when their Bathurst disqualification was finalised that results were confirmed and Italian Schnitzer Motorsport driver Roberto Ravaglia in a BMW M3 was declared the champion. The Entrants Championship was won by the Eggenberger Texaco Ford No 7 entry. The WTCC lasted only one year and was a victim of its own success — the FIA (and Bernie Ecclestone) feared it would take money away from Formula One and stopped sanctioning the Championship. A silhouette formula championship (proposed by Ecclestone) was announced by the FIA for 1988 which would have seen specialist racing chassis carrying bodywork resembling production roadcars powered by the about to be outlawed Formula One 1.5 litre turbo regulations, but manufacturers did not support the concept. Only one car, based on an Alfa Romeo 164 with a 3.5 litre V10 engine was built before it was abandoned.

European Touring Car Championship

In 2001, the European Touring Car Championship (ETCC) was resumed with support from the FIA, the precursor to the current WTCC. In 2001, the Italian Superturismo Championship became the FIA European Super Touring Championship, with an extra class for Super Production cars alongside the main Super Touring class. In 2002, this evolved into the brand new FIA European Touring Car Championship, using Super 2000 rules, dominated by Alfa Romeo and BMW, but popular with the public due to the intense competition and Eurosport live broadcasts.

Return to World Championship status

At the request of interested manufacturers, the ETCC was changed to the current WTCC beginning with the 2005 season, continuing to use Super 2000 and Diesel 2000 regulations. 2004 ETCC Champion Andy Priaulx and his BMW 320i were the dominant driver-car pairing during the first three years of the revived championship, winning the 2005, 2006 and 2007 Drivers and Manufacturers Championships.

In 2008, Frenchman Yvan Muller won the title after Race 1 in Macau in his SEAT León TDI. This marked the first time an FIA sanctioned world championship, in any category, being won by a diesel powered racing car. SEAT León TDI won both championships for a second time in 2009, this time in the hands of Gabriele Tarquini.

2010 marked the start of Chevrolet's dominance of the championship with its Cruze model. Frenchman Yvan Muller became World Champion, fending off tough competition from Gabriele Tarquini and Andy Priaulx to win the first world championship for Chevrolet. Muller continued his success into 2011, winning both drivers championship and helping Chevrolet to its second manufacturers championship after Muller's two teammates finished second and third in the drivers standings. This gave Chevrolet a clean sweep of both titles. The 2012 championship saw Chevrolet pick up where they left off in 2011, leading to a second year of championship clean sweeps, this time with Rob Huff taking the drivers title.

The modern series has held events based all around the world including races in Argentina, Morocco, Hungary, Germany, Russia, France, Portugal, Slovakia, Czech Republic, Japan, China, Thailand and Qatar with former races in  Brazil, Great Britain, Italy, Macau, Netherlands, Spain, Sweden, Turkey and the United States.

Technical rules were modified in 2011 to allow 1.6L turbo gasoline engines, and the 2.0L gasoline and turbodiesel engines were outlawed in 2012. In 2014, new car regulations were introduced with the name TC1, with larger wings and more engine power. The old 1.6L turbo cars were renamed TC2 for a year and were dropped for 2015.

World Touring Car Cup

The series adopted TCR regulations for 2018 and was renamed World Touring Car Cup (WTCR). Official factory teams are not allowed, though many drivers and teams receive backing from manufacturers.

Car regulations
The WTCC uses Super 2000 and Diesel 2000 cars, as cost control is a major theme in the technical regulation. Super 2000 engines are 1.6 L turbo-charged 4-cylinder engines producing approximately 380 bhp. Wheels are 18" in diameter, and large front and rear aerodynamic devices are permitted.

Many technologies that have featured in production cars are not allowed, including variable valve timing, variable intake geometry, ABS brakes and traction control system.

Scoring system

Current scoring system
Currently, all WTCC races are awarded equal points. From 2010, these points have been based on the FIA's points system used in the FIA Formula One Championship and the FIA World Rally Championship.

Previous points systems
Between 2005 and 2009, the championship adopted the following points scoring system:

For the inaugural 1987 season, the championship used the following points scoring system:

Champions

Event winners
As per FIA WTCC all-time statistics on the official site of the WTCC.

Manufacturer entries
The WTCC features entries with the backing, funding and technical support of a motor manufacturer. This can sometimes be a motor racing team running cars of behalf of the manufacturer or cars being run directly by the factory. Below is a timeline of manufacturer entries from the beginning of the championship in 2005.

See also
 World Touring Car Cup
 European Touring Car Championship
 SEAT León Eurocup
 TCR International Series
 List of World Touring Car Championship drivers

References

 Autosport, January 14, 1988

External links

  

 
Fédération Internationale de l'Automobile
Touring car racing series
Recurring sporting events established in 1987
Recurring sporting events disestablished in 2017